The Fiat G.49 was an Italian two-seat basic trainer designed by Giuseppe Gabrielli and built by Fiat.

Design and development
The G.49 was designed by Gabrielli as a replacement for the World War II-era US North American T-6 advanced trainer and was first flown in September 1952. The G.49 was an all-metal low-wing cantilever monoplane with retractable tailwheel landing gear. It had an enclosed cockpit with a raised canopy for a pupil and instructor in tandem. Two variants were built with different engine installations; the G.49-1 with an Alvis Leonides radial engine and the G.49-2 with a Pratt & Whitney radial engine.

Operational history
The aircraft did not sell and only a small number were operated by the Aeronautica Militare.

Variants
G.49-1
Variant powered by a  Alvis Leonides 502/4 Mk 24 radial engine.
G.49-2
Variant powered by a  Pratt & Whitney R-1340-S3H1 Wasp radial engine.
G.49-3
Variant powered by a  I.Ae. 19R El Indio radial engine.

Operators

Italian Air Force  operated two Fiat G.49s for evaluation testing.

Specifications (G.49-2)

See also

References

Notes

Bibliography 
 The Illustrated Encyclopedia of Aircraft (Part Work 1982-1985), 1985, Orbis Publishing, Page 1798

G.049
Low-wing aircraft
Single-engined tractor aircraft
1950s Italian military trainer aircraft
Aircraft first flown in 1952